This is a list of museums in Ethiopia.

List
National Museum of Ethiopia
"Red Terror" Martyrs' Memorial Museum
Rimbaud Museum
Zoological Natural History Museum
 Ethnological Museum, Addis Ababa

See also
Wollega Museum, Oromia Museum

References
Museums in Ethiopia

External links
Museums in Ethiopia

 
Ethiopia
Museums
Museums
Museums
Ethiopia